The Fox Hunt is a 1938 animated short film produced by Walt Disney Productions and released by RKO Radio Pictures. The film stars Donald Duck and Goofy on a traditional English fox hunt. Mickey and Minnie Mouse, Horace Horsecollar, and Clara Cluck also make brief cameos. The film was directed by Ben Sharpsteen and features the voices of Clarence Nash as Donald and Pinto Colvig as Goofy.

Plot
Donald Duck sings "A-Hunting We Will Go" as he takes off on a fox hunt, carrying nothing but a hunting horn and the leashes of several bloodhounds. Donald struggles to control the bloodhounds as they search for the scent of a fox. Meanwhile, Goofy rides a horse as part of the main hunting party. When his horse refuses to jump over a hedge, Goofy demonstrates himself how to make the jump, but discovers a pond directly on the other side.

Eventually, Donald finds the fox and chases him into a burrow. Donald uses blasts from his hunting horn to blow the fox out of the hole. Finally, Donald believes he has cornered the fox in a hollow log. He calls all the other hunters who excitedly arrive at the scene. But when Donald pulls the animal out, he discovers it's nothing but a skunk. The hunters run away in terror. As the skunk prepares to spray, Donald runs away as well as the cartoon ends.

Voice cast
 Mickey Mouse: Walt Disney
 Goofy: Pinto Colvig
 Donald Duck: Clarence Nash
 Clara Cluck: Florence Gill

Releases
1938 Theatrical release
1956 The Mickey Mouse Club (TV)
1957 The Mickey Mouse Club (TV)
Donald's Quack Attack
Mickey's Mouse Tracks

Home media
The short was released on May 18, 2004, on Walt Disney Treasures: The Chronological Donald, Volume One: 1934-1941.

References

External links

The Fox Hunt (1938) at the Big Cartoon DataBase
The Fox Hunt at the Encyclopedia of Disney Animated Shorts

1938 animated films
1938 films
1930s Disney animated short films
Donald Duck short films
Goofy (Disney) short films
Films directed by Ben Sharpsteen
Films about hunters
Animated films about foxes
Films about skunks
Films produced by Walt Disney
1930s American films